Viola canadensis is a flowering plant in the Violaceae family. It is commonly known as Canadian white violet, Canada violet, tall white violet, or white violet. It is widespread across much of Canada and the United States, from Alaska to Newfoundland, south as far as Georgia and Arizona. It is a perennial herb and the Latin specific epithet canadensis means of Canada.

Viola canadensis bears white blooms with yellow bases and sometimes streaks of purple. The petals are purple tinged on the backside. The leaves are heart-shaped, with coarse, rounded teeth.

Subspecies and varieties
Viola canadensis var. canadensis 
Viola canadensis subsp. canadensis 
Viola canadensis var. rugulosa (Greene) C.L. Hitchc.
Viola canadensis subsp. scopulorum (A. Gray) House

Conservation status in the United States
It is listed as endangered in Illinois, Maine, and New Jersey, as threatened in Connecticut, and having a historical range in Rhode Island.

Uses
The leaves and blossoms are edible. The latter can be used to make jelly.

The South Ojibwa use a decoction of the root for pains near the bladder.

References

External links
United States Department of Agriculture Plants Profile: Viola canadensis var. canadensis
United States Department of Agriculture Plants Profile: Viola canadensis var. rugulosa
photo of herbarium specimen at Missouri Botanical Garden, collected in New Mexico in 1897, isotype of Viola neo-mexicana/Viola neomexicana, syn of Viola canadensis

canadensis
Edible plants
Flora of Subarctic America
Plants described in 1753
Taxa named by Carl Linnaeus
Plants used in traditional Native American medicine
Flora of Western Canada
Flora of Eastern Canada
Flora of the Northwestern United States
Flora of the Southwestern United States
Flora of the North-Central United States
Flora of the Northeastern United States
Flora of the Southeastern United States
Flora of New Mexico
Flora without expected TNC conservation status